The resistance to homoserine/threonine (RhtB) family (TC# 2.A.76) belongs to the lysine exporter (LysE) superfamily of transporters. Hundreds of sequenced proteins, derived from Gram-negative and Gram-positive bacteria as well as archaea, comprise the RhtB family, but few of these proteins are functionally characterized.

Members 
The first two members of the RhtB family to be characterized functionally were the RhtB (TC# 2.A.76.1.1) and RhtC (TC# 2.A.76.1.2) permeases of E. coli.

E. coli possesses five paralogues, and a large region of one of them (YahN of E. coli; TC# 2.A.76.1.3) exhibits significant sequence similarity to YggA of E. coli (TC# 2.A.75.1.2), an established member of the LysE family (TC #2.A.75).

The PSI-BLAST program groups the LysE family (TC# 2.A.75), the RhtB family and the CadD family (TC #2.A.77) together. These proteins are all of about the same size and apparent topology, further suggesting a common evolutionary origin.

The leucine exporter homologue (YeaS or LeuE; TC# 2.A.76.1.5) exports leucine and several other neutral, hydrophobic amino acids.

A representative list of proteins belonging to the RhtB family can be found in the Transporter Classification Database.

General transport reaction 
The transport reaction presumably catalyzed by members of the RhtB family is:

amino acid (in) + nH+ (out) ⇌ amino acid (out) + nH+ (in)

See also

References 

Protein families
Solute carrier family